Gay O'Carroll (born 21 January 1964) is an Irish former footballer.

He began his career at Shamrock Rovers making his first team debut in a friendly win at Glenmalure Park in August 1982.

He scored once in 2 appearances in the 1982-83 UEFA Cup.

He joined Shelbourne F.C. in 1984. O'Carroll signed for St Patrick's Athletic F.C. in March 1986.

Sources 
 The Hoops by Paul Doolan and Robert Goggins

References

Republic of Ireland association footballers
Shamrock Rovers F.C. players
Shelbourne F.C. players
St Patrick's Athletic F.C. players
League of Ireland players
1964 births
Living people
Association footballers not categorized by position